Hugo Emilio Mora López (born 7 March 1978) is a Mexican former footballer who played as a forward.

Mora made his first division debut in 1996 at age 18 with Monarcas Morelia.
Mora went on to play for five other clubs in Mexico, including Cruz Azul and Guadalajara.

Mora also appeared 12 times and scored one goal with the Mexico national team. He was called up to the 1998 CONCACAF Gold Cup which Mexico won and also the 2000 CONCACAF Gold Cup.

Honours
Mexico
CONCACAF Gold Cup: 1998

Career statistics

International goals

|-
| 1. || February 17, 2000|| Los Angeles Memorial Coliseum, Los Angeles, United States ||  ||align=center|1–0 || align=center|1–1 || 2000 CONCACAF Gold Cup
|}

References

External links
 
 

1978 births
Living people
Mexico under-20 international footballers
Mexico international footballers
C.D. Veracruz footballers
Atlético Morelia players
Cruz Azul footballers
C.D. Guadalajara footballers
Liga MX players
People from Apatzingán
Footballers from Michoacán
Mexican footballers
Association football forwards
1998 CONCACAF Gold Cup players
Pan American Games medalists in football
Pan American Games gold medalists for Mexico
Footballers at the 1999 Pan American Games
Medalists at the 1999 Pan American Games